Petar Popović (born 13 September 1996) is a Montenegrin professional basketball player for Budućnost VOLI of the ABA League and the Montenegrin League.

Professional career
Popović began his professional career with the 1st-tier Montenegrin Basketball League club KK Lovćen, during the 2011–12 season. After three years with the club, he joined Nea Kifissia of the 1st-tier Greek League signing a three-year deal. In 2016, he was loaned to Mega Leks.

Montenegrin national team
Popović was a member of the junior national teams of Montenegro. He won the gold medal at the 2013 FIBA Europe Under-18 Championship Division B with Montenegro. He has also played at the 2015 FIBA Europe Under-20 Championship Division B and at the 2014 FIBA Europe Under-18 Championship.

References

External links 
 Petar Popović at abaliga.com
 Petar Popović at esake.gr
 Petar Popović at eurobasket.com
 Petar Popović at euroleague.net
 Petar Popović at fibaeurope.com

1996 births
Living people
2019 FIBA Basketball World Cup players
ABA League players
Basketball League of Serbia players
Greek Basket League players
KK Budućnost players
KK Lovćen players
KK Mega Basket players
Montenegrin expatriate basketball people in Serbia
Montenegrin men's basketball players
Nea Kifissia B.C. players
Point guards
Shooting guards